Arnco Mills is an unincorporated community in Coweta County, in the U.S. state of Georgia. A variant name is "Arnco".

History
The name "Arnco" is an amalgamation of Arnold and Cole, the surnames of two proprietors of a local cotton mill.

References

Unincorporated communities in Coweta County, Georgia
Unincorporated communities in Georgia (U.S. state)